Morrys James Scott (born 17 December 1970) is a Welsh former professional footballer. He made a total 32 appearances in The Football League between 1989 and 1993 before moving into the Welsh Premier League.

Career

Despite being born in Swansea, Scott began his career at Cardiff City, the local rivals of his hometown club, making nine appearances during the 1989–90 season, his only start coming in a 3–1 defeat to Leyton Orient. At the end of the season he was released as they suffered relegation to Division Four. He had short spells with Colchester United and Southend United without making a first-team appearance for either side.

In 1991, he joined Plymouth Argyle, making six appearances during a one-year spell. At the start of the 1992–93 season, he joined Northampton Town on a non-contract basis where he scored his first goals as a professional player but was not offered an extended deal and subsequently left the club. After a spell playing non-league football, he signed with Welsh Premier League side Barry Town for the 1994–95 season. He played just three times in the league during the season but did play in both legs of their 7-0 aggregate defeat to Lithuanian side Žalgiris Vilnius in the UEFA Cup Winners' Cup. Scott spent the next six years in the Welsh Premier League with five different clubs, most notably with Afan Lido where he made over 50 appearances during his three spells with the side.

References

External links
Welsh Premier profile

1970 births
Living people
Footballers from Swansea
Welsh footballers
Cardiff City F.C. players
Colchester United F.C. players
Southend United F.C. players
Plymouth Argyle F.C. players
Northampton Town F.C. players
Barry Town United F.C. players
English Football League players
Cymru Premier players
Afan Lido F.C. players
Rhayader Town F.C. players
Association football forwards
Haverfordwest County A.F.C. players
Briton Ferry Athletic F.C. players